Derek Foster is a former professional rugby league footballer who played in the 1960s, 1970s and 1980s.

Playing career

County Cup Final appearances
Derek Foster played , i.e. number 2, and scored a try in Castleford's 7-11 defeat by Hull Kingston Rovers in the 1971 Yorkshire County Cup Final during the 1971–72 season at Belle Vue, Wakefield on Saturday 21 August 1971, and played left-, i.e. number 4, in York's 8-18 defeat by Bradford Northern in the 1978–79 Yorkshire County Cup Final during the 1978–79 season at Headingley Rugby Stadium, Leeds on Saturday 28 October 1978.

Career records
Castleford's most tries scored in a match record is 5-tries, and is jointly held by; Derek Foster against Hunslet on 10 November 1972, John Joyner against Millom on 16 September 1973, Stephen Fenton against Dewsbury on 27 January 1978, Ian French against Hunslet on 9 February 1986, and St. John Ellis against Whitehaven on 10 December 1989.

References

External links
Memory Box Search at archive.castigersheritage.com
Search for "Derek Foster" at britishnewspaperarchive.co.uk

Living people
Castleford Tigers players
English rugby league players
Place of birth missing (living people)
Rugby league centres
Rugby league wingers
Year of birth missing (living people)
York Wasps coaches
York Wasps players